Jonathan Dallas George Jones  (born 14 July 1954) is a senior scientist at the Sainsbury Laboratory and a professor at the University of East Anglia using molecular and genetic approaches to study disease resistance in plants.

Education
Jones was educated at the University of Cambridge where he studied the Natural Sciences Tripos as a student of Peterhouse, Cambridge and graduated with a Bachelor of Arts degree in 1976 followed by a PhD in 1980 supervised by Richard B. Flavell and Gabriel Dover.

Research and career
After his PhD, Jones did postdoctoral research at Harvard University in Frederick M. Ausubel's lab. Along with collaborator Jeffery Dangl, he proposed the zigzag model for the co-evolution of plant resistance genes and pathogen effectors. He also proposed the Guard Hypothesis, which provides a testable explanation for how plants overcome the large number of arms used by pathogens to evoke disease while having only a limited set of plant proteins to defend itself.

Jones has served as head of the Sainsbury Laboratory from 1994 to 1997 and 2003 – 2009. He is also a professor at University of East Anglia and has served as editor of The Plant Cell and 
Genome Biology. Other positions he has held include:

International Society of Plant Molecular Biology board member 1995-8
 Advisory Board 1995-8 of The Plant Journal
 Editor of Plant Cell July 1998 -2004
Current Opinion in Plant Biology (COPB) Editorial Board 1997–present
Invited Editor for COPB Plant/microbe interaction issue 1998
Editor of Genome Biology 2001–2004
Founder of Mendel Biotechnology, Inc. that has collaborated with Monsanto

With George Coupland, Liam Dolan, Nicholas Harberd, Alison Mary Smith, Cathie Martin, Robert Sablowski and Abigail Amey he is a co-author of the textbook Plant Biology.

In July 2010, Jones contributed an opinion piece to BBC News Online, outlining his stance on genetically modified (GM) food crops. In the piece, Jones argued that if we are to 'feed the planet without destroying it... we need to use every tool in our toolbox, including GM'.

Awards and honours
Jones was elected a Fellow of the Royal Society (FRS) in 2003 and has been a member of the National Academy of Sciences since 2015. He was awarded EMBO Membership in 1998.

References

1954 births
Living people
Alumni of Peterhouse, Cambridge
Harvard University people
Academics of the University of East Anglia
Fellows of the Royal Society
Members of the European Molecular Biology Organization
Foreign associates of the National Academy of Sciences
British geneticists